The southern pudu (Pudu puda, Mapudungun püdü or püdu) is a species of South American deer native to the Andes of Chile and Argentina. It is found in high-altitude forests and is classified as Near Threatened in the IUCN Red List.

Description
The southern pudu is characterized by being the second smallest deer in the world. Its coat is a dark chestnut-brown, and tends to tuft in the front, covering the antlers.

Genetic diversity
Analysis of the mtDNA control region and cytochrome b of the southern pudu across Chile revealed that different populations have marked genetic differences, with a large number of unique haplotypes in each population and few shared haplotypes between populations. This indicates that gene flow is reduced and most populations are reproductively isolated from each other. The population from Chiloé Island is estimated to have become isolated from continental populations more than 200 thousand years ago and may constitute a separate subspecies. This reproductive isolation makes each population an important evolutionary unit but also increases their vulnerability since a drastic reduction in the number of individuals would decrease genetic diversity without recovery from migrating individuals coming from neighboring areas.

Further reading

References

Capreolinae
Mammals of Chile
Mammals of Argentina
Taxa named by Juan Ignacio Molina
Mammals described in 1782
Fauna of the Valdivian temperate rainforest